Enigmogramma is a genus of moths of the family Noctuidae.

Species
 Enigmogramma admonens Walker, [1858]
 Enigmogramma antillea Becker, 2001
 Enigmogramma basigera Walker, 1865
 Enigmogramma feisthamelii Guenée, 1852
 Enigmogramma limata Schaus, 1911
 Enigmogramma phytolacca Sepp, [1848]

References
 Enigmogramma at Markku Savela's Lepidoptera and Some Other Life Forms
 Natural History Museum Lepidoptera genus database

Plusiinae